Javon Mascellus Bullard is an American football defensive back for the Georgia Bulldogs.

High school career 
Bullard attended Baldwin High School in Milledgeville, Georgia. A three-star recruit, Bullard committed to play college football at the University of Georgia over offers from Auburn and Tennessee.

College career 

As a true freshman in 2021, Bullard appeared in 14 games. Against Charleston Southern, Bullard led Georgia in total tackles with six. He finished the season with 12 total tackles. The following season, Bullard started in the first two games, recording four tackles and one pass breakup. On September 26, 2022, Bullard was arrested on DUI charges. He would be suspended for one game before returning against Auburn. Bullard would tally a career-high eight tackles in a victory over Florida. In the game of the century, Bullard tallied seven tackles and two sacks in a 27-13 win. The following week, Bullard exited the game with a lower-leg injury, but he returned for the next game against Kentucky. During the 2023 College Football Playoff National Championship Game, Bullard recorded two interceptions and a fumble recovery before leaving the game with a shoulder injury. He was named the game's defensive MVP.

References

External links 

 Georgia Bulldogs bio

Living people
American football defensive backs
Georgia Bulldogs football players
Players of American football from Georgia (U.S. state)
African-American players of American football
Sportspeople from Georgia (U.S. state)
Year of birth missing (living people)